The 1646 Programme of fourth-rate  vessels were basically three individual ships built to differing dimensions. With Parliament approving the disposal of six elderly ships, instructions were issued for the speedy building of other vessels in their place. The main specification was to build vessels to carry 32 to 34 guns. Each vessel would have 11 pairs lower deck gun ports and five or six pairs on the quarterdeck. The vessels would actually have varying number of guns and the dimensional data would vary considerably. Three vessels were ordered in December 1645.

Design and specifications
The construction of the vessels was assigned to Woolwich and Deptford dockyards. The ships would be built under the supervision of Peter Pett I at Deptford and Peter Pett II at Woolwich. As with most vessels of this time period only order and launch dates are available. The dimensional data was so varied that it will be listed on the individual vessels along with their gun armament.

Ships of the 1646 Programme Group

Citations

References
 British Warships in the Age of Sail (1603 – 1714), by Rif Winfield, published by Seaforth Publishing, England © Rif Winfield 2009, EPUB , Chapter 4, The Fourth Rates - 'Small Ships', Vessels acquired from 24 March 1603, 1646 Programme
 Ships of the Royal Navy, by J.J. Colledge, revised and updated by Lt-Cdr Ben Warlow and Steve Bush, published by Seaforth Publishing, Barnsley, Great Britain, © the estate of J.J. Colledge, Ben Warlow and Steve Bush 2020, EPUB 

 

Frigates of the Royal Navy
Ships of the Royal Navy